Sergey Alexandrovich Alexeyev (26 September 1868, Kazan, Imperial Russia, — 5 December 1922, Yalta, Soviet Russia) was a Russian playwright, better known under his pen name Naydyonov (Найдёнов), another one being Rogozhin (Рогожин). His debut play, the semi-autobiographical  Vanyushin's Children (Deti Vanyushina, Дети Ванюшина, 1901) proved to be his most famous one and is considered part of the classic Russian drama legacy. It earned him the Griboyedov Prize which he shared that year with Maxim Gorky (The Philistines) and Vladimir Nemirovich-Danchenko (In Dreams). His other notable plays include The Life of Avdotya (Avdotyina zhizn, Авдотьина жизнь, 1904), praised by Maxim Gorky and Walls (Steny, Стены, 1907).

References

External links
 Найденов Сергей Александрович. The plays by Naydyonov at Lib.ru

Dramatists and playwrights from the Russian Empire
Pseudonymous writers
Writers from Kazan
1868 births
1922 deaths